Ngayap (English: "wing") was a courting practice traditionally practiced in the Iban community, in which male efforts to court a female virgin were performed at night.

This ngayap practice was undertaken to allow the boy and the girl to meet and express their hearts to their partners. Although the practice of ngayap was allowed in the past, it is currently highly discouraged, and should only be done with expected manners based on Iban customs and way of life, to avoid any thought and slander that might contaminate the Iban culture.

By custom, the male can meet the girl not more than three nights in a row. If visits continue, the parents of the girl have the right to interview the boy and ask him if he is serious in his efforts to court. If it is found that the boy is not honest in love, then his visit would be stopped immediately. However, if the boy's intentions are serious, and he intends to marry the girl, the boy would inform his parents of his intentions. If the boy continues his nocturnal visits without deciding, then the girl's parents have the right to detain the boy, arrange the marriage in question, and then refer the matter to the Tuai Rumah (Sarawak longhouse chief) and the longhouse residents concerned.

Nowadays, the tradition and practice of ngayap is no longer practiced in modern Iban life. Thus, meetings between boy and girl are run during gatherings, like festivals, schools, institutions of higher learning, and the workplace of their spouses. Ngayap is, today, only a small part of the Iban cultural heritage. To prevent this culture of abuse by the new generation, this practice is generally limited to the Iban. Only if there is a violation or interference of others in this practice, the law can be taken as cited in Section 132 of Adat Iban of 1993.

References